Lt. General Ziaur Rahman   (19 January 1936 – 30 May 1981), was a Bangladeshi military officer and politician who served as the President of Bangladesh from 1977 to 1981. He was assassinated on 30 May 1981 in Chittagong in an coup d'état staged by some of his colleagues in army.

Rahman was a Bangladesh Forces Commander of BDF Sector 1 initially, and from June as BDF commander of BDF Sector 11 of the Bangladesh Forces and the Brigade Commander of Z Force from mid-July during the country's Independence war from Pakistan in 1971. He originally broadcast the Bangladesh declaration of independence on 27 March from Kalurghat radio station in Chittagong. After the war of Independence, Rahman became a brigade commander in Bangladesh Army, and later the deputy chief of staff and chief of staff of Bangladesh Army. His ascent to leadership of the country resulted from a conspiracy that had begun with the killing of Sheikh Mujibur Rahman, the founding president of Bangladesh, in a military coup d'état followed by a coup and counter-revolt within the military to gain control at the helm. Ziaur Rahman gained de facto power as head of the government already under martial law imposed by the Mushtaq government. He took over the presidency in 1977.

As president in 1978, Rahman founded the Bangladesh Nationalist Party (popularly known by its abbreviation BNP). He reinstated multi-party politics, freedom of the press, free speech and free markets and accountability. He initiated mass irrigation and food production programmes, including social programmes to uplift the lives of the people. His government initiated efforts to create a regional group in South Asia, which later became SAARC in 1985. He improved Bangladesh's relations with the West and China, and departed from Sheikh Mujibur Rahman's close alignment with India. Domestically, Rahman faced as many as twenty-one coup attempts for which trials were set up, and many soldiers and officers of the Bangladesh Armed Forces were executed, which were mostly claimed to be biased and false trials. He was criticized for passing the Indemnity Act and removing the ban on religion-based political parties.

Rahman was awarded two gallantry awards for two wars fought in South Asia. Hilal-i-Jurat for the Indo-Pak War in 1965, and Bir Uttom in 1972 for the Bangladesh Independence war 1971 for his wartime contributions.
According to the 1986 book Bangladesh: A Legacy of Blood written by Anthony Mascarenhas, Rahman retired from the Bangladesh Army as a Lt. General (promoted by himself) in 1978 with effect from 29 April.

The political party Rahman formed in 1978, the BNP, has remained one of the two dominant political parties of Bangladesh alongside its chief rival, the Awami League. Since Rahman's death, his wife, Khaleda Zia, has presided as chairperson of the party and served 2 full terms as prime minister during her tenure.

Early life
Ziaur Rahman was born on 19 January 1936 to a Bengali Muslim family of Mandals in the village of Bagbari in Gabtali, Bogra District. His father, Mansur Rahman, was a chemist who specialised in paper and ink chemistry and worked for a government department at Writers' Building in Kolkata. His grandfather, Moulvi Kamaluddin Mandal, migrated from Mahishaban to Nashipur-Bagbari after marrying his grandmother Meherunnisa. Ziaur Rahman has Iranian ancestry through Meherunnisa, whose forefathers arrived in Ghoraghat during the Mughal period. His mother's name was Jahanara Khatun. Rahman was raised in his home village of Bagbari and studied in Bogra Zilla School. He had two younger brothers, Ahmed Kamal (d. 2017) and Khalilur Rahman (d. 2014).

In 1946, Mansur enrolled Rahman for a short stint in a boys school of Calcutta, Hare School, where he studied until the dissolution of the British Empire in India and partition of India and Pakistan in 1947. Mansur Rahman exercised his option to become a citizen of a Muslim majority Pakistan and in August 1947 moved to Karachi the first capital of Pakistan located in Sindh, West Pakistan. Zia, at the age of 11, had become a student in class six at the Academy School in Karachi in 1947. Rahman spent his adolescent years in Karachi and by age 16 completed his secondary education from that School in 1952.

In 1953, Rahman was admitted into the D. J. Sindh Government Science College. In the same year, he joined the Pakistan Military Academy at Kakul as a cadet.

In August 1960, his marriage was arranged to Khaleda Khanam Putul, the 15-year-old daughter of Iskandar Majumder and Taiyaba Majumder from the Feni District (part of then Noakhali District). Khaleda Khanam Putul, later known as Khaleda Zia, went on serve as the Prime Minister of Bangladesh three times. Rahman, a captain in the then Pakistan Army who was posted at that time as an Officer of the Defence Forces. His father, Mansur Rahman could not attend the marriage ceremony, as he was in Karachi. Zia's mother had died earlier.

Military career in the Pakistan Army
Graduating from the Pakistan Military Academy at 12th PMA long course on 18 September 1955 in the top 10% of his class, Rahman was commissioned as a second lieutenant in the Pakistan Army. In the army, he received commando training, became a paratrooper and received training in a special intelligence course.

Rahman went to East Pakistan on a short visit and was struck by the negative attitude of the Bengali middle class towards the military, which consumed a large chunk of the country's resources. The low representation of the Bengalis in the military was largely due to discrimination, but Rahman felt that the Bengali attitude towards the military perhaps prevented promising young Bengali from seeking military careers. As a Bengali army officer he advocated military careers for Bengali youth.
After serving for two years in Karachi, he was transferred to the East Bengal Regiment in 1957. He attended military training schools of British Army. He also worked in the military intelligence department from 1959 to 1964.

Ayub Khan's military rule from 1958 to 1968 convinced Rahman of the need for a fundamental change in the Bengali attitude towards the military. During the Indo-Pakistani War of 1965, Rahman saw combat in the Khemkaran sector in Punjab as the commander of a company (military unit) of 100–150 soldiers. Rahman was awarded Hilal-i-Jur'at for gallantry by the Pakistan government medal, Pakistan's second highest military award, and the first Battalion of the East Bengal Regiment (EBR) under which he fought won 3 Sitara-e-Jurat (Star of Courage) medals, and 8 Tamgha-i-Jurat (Medal of Courage) medals, for their role in the 1965 War with India. In 1966, Rahman was appointed military instructor at the Pakistan Military Academy, later going on to attend the Command and Staff College in Quetta, Pakistan, he completed a course in command and tactical warfare. Rahman helped raise two Bengali battalions called the 8th and 9th Bengals during his stint as instructor. Around the same time, his wife Khaleda Zia, now 24, gave birth to their first child Tarique Rahman on 20 November 1966. Rahman joined the 2nd East Bengal regiment as its second-in-command at Joydebpur in Gazipur district, near Dhaka, in 1969, and travelled to West Germany to receive advanced military and command training from the British Army of the Rhine and later spent a few months with the British Army.

Pre-Independence

Rahman returned to Pakistan the following year. He was posted in Chittagong, East Pakistan in October 1970 to be second-in-command of the 8th East Bengal Regiment. East Pakistan had been devastated by the 1970 Bhola cyclone, and the population had been embittered by the slow response of the central government and the political conflict between Pakistan's two major parties, Sheikh Mujibur Rahman's Awami League, and Zulfiqar Ali Bhutto's Pakistan People's Party (PPP). In the 1970 Pakistani general election, the Awami League had won a majority and its leader Sheikh Mujib laid claim to form a government, but Pakistan President Yahya Khan postponed the convening of the legislature under pressure from Zulfikar Ali Bhutto's PPP party.

Bangladesh War of Liberation 1971
Following the failure of last-ditch talks, Yahya Khan declared martial law and ordered the army to crack down on Bengali political activities. Sheikh Mujibur Rahman was arrested before midnight on 26 March 1971, taken to Tejgaon International Airport and flown to West Pakistan.

Zia, who already by then geared to revolt against the government of Pakistan revolted and later arrested and executed his commanding officer Lt. Col. Janjua. He was requested by the local Awami League supporters and leaders, to announce the Declaration of Independence that was earlier (in early hours of 26 March 1971) proclaimed by the undisputed Bengali leader Bangabandhu Sheikh Mujibur Rahman, before his (Ziaur Rahman) arrest on 27 March 1971 from Kalurghat, Chittagong, as an Army officer's words would carry weight restoring people's trust in the 'Declaration of Independence', which read:.

I, Major Ziaur Rahman, Provincial Head of the government, do hereby declare that Independence of the People's Republic of Bangladesh.
But his (Ziaur Rahman) proclamation as the "Provincial Head" of the government, was much criticized and rebuked by the political leaders present there and he realized his mistake.

Later on the same day (27 March), a second broadcast was read as correction:

I, Major Ziaur Rahman, do hereby declare the Independence of Bangladesh in the name of our great leader Bangabandhu Sheikh Mujibur Rahman.

Later in an interview with German Radio, Rahman talked about his 27 March announcement.

Rahman organised an infantry unit gathering all Bengali soldiers from military and EPR units in Chittagong. He designated it Sector No. 1 with its HQ in Sabroom. A few weeks later he was transferred to Teldhala where he organised and created Sector 11. All sectors were restructured officially under Bangladesh Forces as the sector in the Chittagong and Hill Tracts area, under Colonel M. A. G. Osmani, the Supreme Commander of Bangladesh Forces, of the Provisional Government of Bangladesh which had its headquarters on Theatre Road, Calcutta in India. On 30 July 1971 Rahman was appointed the commander of the first conventional brigade of the Bangladesh Forces, which was named "Z Force", after the first initial of his name. His brigade consisted of 1st, 3rd and 8th East Bengali regiments, enabling Rahman to launch major attacks on Pakistani forces. With the Z Force, Rahman "acquired a reputation for icy bravery" according to The New York Times, and was awarded the Bir Uttom, the second-highest military honour (and the highest for living officers) by the Government of Bangladesh.

Assassination of Mujib in 1975 and its aftermath

A deep conspiracy with the purpose of removing Sheikh Mujibur Rahman from the helm was well under way long before his assassination by outside forces and internal collaborators within Bangladesh. On 15 August 1975 President Sheikh Mujibur Rahman and his family were assassinated in a gun fight with army personnel. One of Mujibur Rahman's cabinet ministers and a leading conspirator Khondaker Mostaq Ahmad gained the presidency and dismissed Major General K M Shafiullah, who had stayed neutral during the coup. Major General Ziaur Rahman (then deputy chief of army staff) was appointed as army chief of staff, after Shafiullah resigned. However, the coup of 15 August caused a period of instability and unrest in Bangladesh and amongst the rank and file of the armed forces. Brigadier Khaled Mosharraf and the 46th Brigade of Dhaka Cantonment under Colonel Shafaat Jamil revolted against Khandaker Mushtaq Ahmed's administration on 3 November 1975, and Ziaur Rahman was forced to relinquish his post and put under house arrest. This was followed on November 7 by (Sipoy-Janata Biplob) Soldiers and People's Coup, a mutiny staged by the Jatiyo Samajtantrik Dal (JSD or National Socialist Party) under retired Lieutenant Colonel Abu Taher and a group of socialist military officers. Khaled Mosharraf was killed by his subordinate officers while he was sheltering with them from the mutineers. Shafaat Jamil escaped but was injured, while Rahman was freed by the 2nd Artillery regiment under Lt. Col. Rashid and re-appointed as army chief of staff with full support of the rank and file of the army.

Following a meeting at army headquarters, an interim government was formed with Justice Abu Sadat Mohammad Sayem as chief martial law administrator and Ziaur Rahman, Air Vice Marshal M. G. Tawab and Rear Admiral M. H. Khan as his deputies. However, discipline in the army had totally collapsed and it was difficult to disarm the soldiers supported by JSD and Lt. Col. Taher, as they plotted another coup to remove Rahman. Rahman realised that the disorder had to be suppressed firmly if discipline was to be restored in the Bangladesh Army. Rahman cracked down on the JSD and Gonobahini. Abu Taher was sentenced to death in July 1976 and other party figures received various terms of imprisonment. Taher was executed on 21 July 1976. Rahman became the chief martial law administrator following Justice Sayem's elevation to the presidency on 6 November 1975. He tried to integrate the armed forces, giving repatriates a status appropriate to their qualifications and seniority. While this angered some veterans of the independence war, who had rapidly reached high positions following independence in 1971, Rahman sent discontented officers on diplomatic missions abroad to defuse unrest.

Presidency

Rahman became the President of Bangladesh on 21 April 1977. Years of disorder from the previous political administration of the Awami League and BAKSAL had left most of Bangladesh's state institutions in disarray, with constant internal and external threats. After becoming president in 1977, Rahman lifted martial law and introduced massive reforms for the development of the country.

In late September 1977, a failed coup against his administration occurred. A group of Japanese Red Army terrorists hijacked Japan Airlines Flight 472 from India armed with weapons and ammunition and forced it to land in Tejgaon International Airport. On 30 September, while the attention of the government was riveted on this crisis situation, due to spreading of panic and disinformation actions went under way in Bogra Cantonment where a revolt broke out. Although the revolt was quickly quelled on the night of 2 October, another revolt started in Dhaka cantonment, led by misinformed airmen of Bangladesh Air Force (BAF). Armed units from these army and air force personnel unsuccessfully attacked Zia's residence, captured Dhaka Radio for a short time and killed eleven air force officers and 30 airmen at Tejgaon International Airport, where they were gathered for negotiations with the hijackers. Wing Commander M. Hamidullah Khan TJ, SH, BP (BDF Commander Bangladesh Forces Sector 11), then BAF Ground Defence Commander, quickly put down the rebellion within the Air Force, while the government was severely shaken. Chief of Air Staff AVM AG Mahmud reappointed Wing Commander Hamidullah Khan as Provost Marshal of BAF. President Zia immediately appointed Wing Commander Hamidullah Khan as ZMLA (Dhaka) and Director of Martial Law Communications and Control at Tejgaon (present day PM's Office). Government intelligence had failed and President Rahman promptly dismissed the DG-NSI and the DFI chief, AVM Aminul Islam Khan, of 9th GD(P) formerly coursemate of AVM A. K. Khandkar of Pakistan Air Force. Under Zia's Presidential directive Hamidullah initiated the transfer of DFI at Old Bailey Road from the ministry of defence to Dhaka Cantonment under direct control of the president and reorganized as DGFI. In the aftermath at least 200 soldiers involved in the coup attempt were executed following a military trial. .

The size of Bangladesh police forces was doubled and the number of soldiers of the army increased from 50,000 to 90,000. In 1978 he appointed Hussain Muhammad Ershad as the new Chief of Army Staff, promoting him to the rank of lieutenant general. He was viewed as a professional soldier with no political aspirations because of his imprisonment in former West Pakistan during the Bangladesh War of Independence. Quietly Ershad rose to become Zia's close political and military counsellor.

Elections
In 1978, General Rahman ran for and an overwhelmingly won a five-year term as president. The next year elections were held for the National Assembly. Opponents questioned the integrity of the elections.

Zia allowed Sheikh Hasina, the exiled daughter of Sheikh Mujibur Rahman, to return to Bangladesh in 1981.

Domestic and foreign policies
On taking power, Rahman was "hailed as the strict leader that the struggling nation needed". Bangladesh suffered from illiteracy, severe poverty, chronic unemployment, shortages and economic stagnation. Rahman reversed course from his predecessor Mujib's secular, democratic socialist, pro-Indian policies. Rahman announced a "19-point programme" of economic emancipation which emphasised self-reliance, rural development, decentralisation, free markets and population control. Rahman spent much of his time travelling throughout the country, preaching the "politics of hope" and urging Bangladeshis to work harder and to produce more. He held cabinet meetings all across Bangladesh. Rahman focused on boosting agricultural and industrial production, especially in food and grains, and to integrate rural development through a variety of programmes, of which population planning was the most important. He introduced and opened the Bangladesh Jute and Rice research institutes. He launched an ambitious rural development programme in 1977, which included a highly visible and popular food-for-work programme. He promoted private sector development, exports growth and the reversing of the collectivisation of farms. His government reduced quotas and restrictions on agriculture and industrial activities. Rahman launched major projects to construct irrigation canals, power stations, dams, roads and other public works. Directing his campaign to mobilise rural support and development, Rahman established Gram Sarkar (Village Councils) system of self-government and the "Village Defence Party" system of security and crime prevention. Programmes to promote primary and adult education on a mass scale were initiated and focused mainly across rural Bangladesh. During this period, Bangladesh's economy achieved fast economic and industrial growth.

Rahman began reorienting Bangladesh's foreign policy, addressing the concerns of the mostly staunch rightists coupled with some renegade leftist who believed that Bangladesh was reliant on Indian economic and military aid. Rahman moved away from India and the Soviet bloc, his predecessors' had worked with, developing closer relations with the United States and Western Europe, Africa and the Middle East. Rahman also moved to harmonise ties with Saudi Arabia and the People's Republic of China, Pakistan's ally who had opposed Bangladesh's creation and had not recognised it until 1975. Rahman moved to normalise relations with Pakistan. While distancing Bangladesh from India, Rahman sought to improve ties with other Islamic nations. Zia's move towards Islamic state policies improved the nation's standing in the Middle East. According to historian Tazeen M. Murshid, one aim of these policies was to open the Gulf states to manpower exports. In this Zia was successful, and remittances became an important part of the Bangladeshi economy.

Rahman also proposed an organisation of the nations of South Asia to bolster economic and political co-operation at a regional level. This proposal materialised in 1985 under the Presidency of Hussain Muhammad Ershad with the first meeting of the South Asia Association for Regional Cooperation in Dhaka. Zia's vision has earned him a posthumous award from the organisation.

Islam and nationalism

Rahman believed that a massive section of the population was suffering from an identity crisis, both religious and as a people, with a very limited sense of sovereignty. To remedy this he began a re-Islamisation of Bangladesh. He issued a proclamation order amending the constitution, under whose basis laws would be set in an effort to increase the self-knowledge of religion and nation. In the preamble, he inserted the salutation "Bismillahir-Rahmaanir-Rahim" ("In the name of Allah, the Beneficent, the Merciful"). In Article 8(1) and 8(1A) the statement "absolute trust and faith in Almighty Allah"' was added, replacing the socialist commitment to secularism. Socialism was redefined as "economic and social justice" under his leadership. In Article 25(2), Rahman introduced the principle that '"the state shall endeavour to consolidate, preserve and strengthen fraternal relations among Muslim countries based on Islamic solidarity." Some intellectuals accuse Rahman of changing the nature of the republic from the secularism laid out by Sheikh Mujib and his supporters. However, critics of this accusation say the rationale is absurd and an oversimplification since secular leaders like Gamal Abdel Nasser and Ahmed Ben Bella adopted this policy, and that religious slogans and symbolism are also used by the Awami League.

Later Rahman introduced Islamic religious education as a compulsory subject for Muslim schoolchildren. At the birth of Bangladesh, many Islamists had supported the Pakistani Army's fight against independence and been barred from politics with the Bangladesh Collaborators (Special Tribunals) Order of 1972. Rahman undid this as well as the ban on communal parties and associations.

In public speeches and policies that he formulated, Rahman began expounding "Bangladesh Nationalism," its "Sovereignty," as opposed to Mujib's assertion of a Bengali identity based under language-based nationalism. Rahman emphasised the national role of Islam as guide to life's principle. Claiming to promote an inclusive national identity, Rahman reached out to non-Bengali minorities such as the Santals, Garos, Manipuris and Chakmas, as well as the Urdu-speaking peoples of Bihari origin. He even amended the constitution to change the nationality of the citizens from Bengali, an ethnic identity, to Bangladeshi, a national identity, under sovereign allegiance not political belief or party affiliation. However, Bangladeshi nationalism excluded the country's non-Muslim minorities, particularly the Hindu community.

After the formation of Bangladesh Nationalist Party in 1978, Rahman took initiative for formation of political institutes and sponsored workshops for the youth to get active political lessons on Bangladesh nationalism. In such a workshop in September 1980, Rahman spoke to the learners.

Indemnity Act

Rahman enacted several controversial measures, some to discipline the army, some to solidify his power and some to win the support of right wing political groups such as the Jamaat-e-Islami. Zia also facilitated the comeback of the Muslim League and other Islamic parties, appointed the highly controversial anti-independence figure Shah Azizur Rahman (who was earlier released from jail by Sheikh Mujibur Rahman in 1973) prime minister.

Rahman gave foreign appointments to several men accused of assassinating Sheikh Mujibur Rahman. Major Dalim, Major Rashid and Major Faruk were given jobs in the Ministry of Foreign Affairs, and in subsequent years they were appointed ambassadors of Bangladesh to African and Middle Eastern nations.

The Indemnity Ordinance (which gave immunity from legal action to the persons involved in the assassination of president Sheikh Mujibur Rahman, coups and other political events between 1975 and 1979) was proclaimed by Khondaker Mostaq Ahmad in 1975 president, ratified in the Parliament as the Indemnity Act, and incorporated as the 5th amendment to the constitution during the tenure of President Hussain Muhammad Ershad.

Assassination

During his term of power, Rahman was criticised for ruthless treatment of his army opposition. Although he enjoyed overall popularity and public confidence, Zia's rehabilitation of some of the most controversial men in Bangladesh aroused fierce opposition from the supporters of the Awami League and veterans of its Mukti Bahini. Amidst speculation and fears of unrest, Rahman went on tour to Chittagong on 29 May 1981 to help resolve an intra-party political dispute in the regional BNP. Rahman and his entourage stayed overnight at the Chittagong Circuit House. In the early hours of the morning of 30 May, he was assassinated by a group of army officers. Also killed were six of his bodyguards and two aides.

Nearly two million people are estimated to have attended the funeral held at the Parliament Square.

Criticism and legacy 

Many Bangladeshi politicians consider Rahman a war hero. However, his role after 15 August 1975 assassination of Sheikh Mujibur Rahman and his family remains controversial. The Indemnity Act, an ordinance ordered by Khondaker Mostaq Ahmad in 1975 pardoning the subsequently convicted killers of Sheikh Mujibur Rahman, was legalised by Rahman during his tenure as president. Some killers of Sheikh Mujibur Rahman and his family were sent abroad during his time as president.

The Dhaka High Court declared the seizures of power by military coups between 1975 and 1979, including Zia's military regime, as "unlawful and unconstitutional." Zia's martial law decrees, his ascendancy to the presidency in 1977 and the election held in 1978 were declared "unknown to the constitution." The court ruling over-ruled the Indemnity Act by which these very events were accorded a legal status and enshrined in the constitution.

Rahman is credited for ending the disorder of the final years of Sheikh Mujib's rule and establishing democracy by abolishing BAKSHAL (One party rule established by Mujib). On the other hand, Rahman is assailed by his critics for suppressing opposition. It is claimed that around 3,000 soldiers, military officials and civilians either disappeared or were killed during his reign. On one occasion, about 1,143 people were hanged in various Bangladeshi prisons, on charges of participating in a failed coup attempt on 2 October 1977.

However, Zia's economic reforms are credited with rebuilding the economy and his move towards Islamisation brought him the support of ordinary Bangladeshi people. His nationalist vision also appealed to many who resented the other political parties alleged inclination towards India and the Soviet Union. Moving away from Mujib's secularism, Rahman asserted an Islamist political identity for Bangladesh and membership in the wider community of Muslim nations, which was applauded by the public.

However, many historians have said these measures laid the foundations of future communal and ethnic conflicts by isolating and embittering many ethnic and religious minorities in Bangladesh. Critics of this view say this is an oversimplification, and that Rahman alone cannot be held responsible for these tensions. It is generally acknowledged that he lived a simple life, which included opting to have his food supplied from the army canteen.

Family 
With Khaleda Zia, Rahman had two sons, Tareq Rahman and Arafat Rahman (d. 2015). Khaleda became the head of the BNP and organised a coalition of political parties opposed to Ershad's regime. In elections held in 1991, she led the BNP to victory and became the first female prime minister of Bangladesh. She lost the 1996 elections to the Awami League's Sheikh Hasina, but returned to power in 2001. Tareq served as the BNP senior joint secretary.

Honours
Turkey has named a road in Ankara as Ziaur Rahman Caddesi after his death to honour him. In 2004, Ziaur Rahman was ranked number 20 in BBC's poll of the Greatest Bengali of all time. Zia was also honoured by the South Asian Association for Regional Cooperation for his statesmanship and vision. Other honours include:
 : Hilal-i-Jur'at
 : Order of the Nile
 : Order of the Yugoslav Star
 : Hero of the Republic

See also
BM Abbas

Notes

References

Further reading

External links
 
 Ziaur Rahman Biography
 Ziaur Rahman on Virtual Bangladesh
 
 US State Department Secret Telegram on Bangladesh Declaration of Independence
 Former US President Jimmy Carter on President Ziaur Rahman
 Khaleda Zia, the most potential mediator to resolve ME crisis

 
1936 births
1981 deaths
Assassinated Bangladeshi politicians
Assassinated heads of state
Bangladesh Nationalist Party politicians
Chairpersons of the Bangladesh Nationalist Party
20th-century Bengalis
Chiefs of Army Staff, Bangladesh
Deaths by firearm in Bangladesh
Recipients of Hilal-i-Jur'at
Presidents of Bangladesh
Recipients of the Bir Uttom
Bangladeshi political party founders
Bangladesh Army generals
Bangladeshi people of Iranian descent
People from Bogra District
Hare School alumni
D. J. Sindh Government Science College alumni
Mukti Bahini personnel
Sunni Muslims
Bangladeshi Muslims
1981 murders in Bangladesh
Pakistan Command and Staff College alumni
Majumder–Zia family